Birds of Prey is the fifth studio album by English duo Godley & Creme, released in April 1983 by Polydor Records. It was recorded at Lymehouse Studios in Leatherhead, Surrey and engineered and re-mixed at Nigel Gray's Surrey Sound Studios.

Despite the success of their previous studio album Ismism (1981), Birds of Prey failed to chart. Two singles were released from the album: "Save a Mountain for Me" and "Samson", both of which also failed to chart.

Critical reception

In a retrospective review for AllMusic, critic Dave Thompson deemed the album "the least successful inclusion in the Godley & Creme catalog", and called it "a major disappointment".

Track listing

Personnel
 Kevin Godley
 Lol Creme
 Guy Barker – trumpet on "Save a Mountain for Me"

References

External links
 

1983 albums
Godley & Creme albums
Polydor Records albums